ph2, ph-2, ph.2 or variant, may refer to:
 AMD Phenom II CPU chip
 PH2 (Planet Hunters 2), star system with a planet
 PH2 b, a planet around that star
 1991 PH2 or 9341 Gracekelly
 1992 PH2 or (13089) 1992 PH2
 Hall PH-2, biplane flying boat
 Pander PH.2 Mayer, see List of aircraft (P)
 biphenyl, Ph2 or Ph-Ph
 Phenolphthalein, ph2 or phph
 PH2, a postcode in Perth, see PH postcode area